Mali Is... is the third album by American recording artist Mali Music, released on June 18, 2014 by RCA Records and Bystorm Records. Mali Music worked with Arden "Keyz" Altino, Oliver "Akos" Castelli, Akene Dunkley, Jerry "Wonda" Duplessis, Andre Harris, Stephen McGregor, and Kortney Pollard on the production of this album. The album's lead single is "Beautiful".

Reception

Signaling in a four star out of five review for AllMusic, Andy Kellman replying, at times "Understated yet energized" where "all singles, all distinctive, and compelling." Andy Argyrakis, agrees it is a four star album for CCM Magazine, realizing, it "overflows with velvety vocals and smooth grooves" where it's "split between soulful pop, piano ballads, and the occasional nod to contemporary reggae." Adding a whole star to his rating compared to the aforementioned, New Release Tuesday's Dwayne Lacy, recognizing, this music "for the non-cliched songwriting, his amazing singing and the message."

Track listing

Charts

Weekly charts

Year-end charts

References

2014 albums
Mali Music (singer) albums
RCA Records albums